Richard Goldsmith Burges (4 December 1847 – 25 September 1905) was an Australian pastoralist and politician who served in both houses of the Parliament of Western Australia. He was a member of the Legislative Council from 1894 to 1903, and then served in the Legislative Assembly from 1903 until his death.

Burges was born in York, Western Australia, to Vittoria (née Meares) and Samuel Evans Burges. His older half-brother, Thomas Burges, was also a member of parliament, as were two of his uncles, William and Lockier Burges. Burges eventually took over Tipperary, his father's property near York, having earlier held various leases in the North-West. He was elected to the York Roads Board in 1882, and served until his death, including as chairman for a period. Burges entered parliament at the 1894 Legislative Council elections, as one of three members for the new East Province. He was re-elected in 1898, but resigned in March 1903 to contest a Legislative Assembly by-election for the seat of York, caused by the bankruptcy of Frederick Monger. Burges won the by-election, and was subsequently re-elected at the 1904 state election. He died in office in September 1905 (aged 57), having caught pneumonia while returning from a trip to the eastern states and then suffered heart failure. Burges had married Mona Phillips in 1878, with whom he had seven children. Both his father-in-law, Samuel Pole Phillips, and brother-in-law, Samuel James Phillips, were also members of parliament.

References

1847 births
1905 deaths
Australian pastoralists
Australian people of Irish descent
Deaths from pneumonia in South Australia
Mayors of places in Western Australia
Members of the Western Australian Legislative Assembly
Members of the Western Australian Legislative Council
People from York, Western Australia
19th-century Australian businesspeople
19th-century Australian politicians
Western Australian local councillors